
Gmina Zatory is a rural gmina (administrative district) in Pułtusk County, Masovian Voivodeship, in east-central Poland.

Villages
Gmina Zatory contains the villages and settlements of Borsuki-Kolonia, Burlaki, Cieńsza, Ciski, Dębiny, Drwały, Gładczyn, Gładczyn Rządowy, Gładczyn Szlachecki, Kępa Zatorska, Kruczy Borek, Łęcino, Lemany, Lutobrok, Lutobrok-Folwark, Malwinowo, Mierzęcin, Mystkowiec-Kalinówka, Mystkowiec-Szczucin, Nowe Borsuki, Pniewo, Pniewo-Kolonia, Przyłubie, Śliski, Stawinoga, Topolnica, Wiktoryn, Wólka Zatorska and Zatory.

Neighbouring gminas
Gmina Zatory is bordered by the gminas of Obryte, Pokrzywnica, Pułtusk, Rząśnik, Serock and Somianka.

References

External links
Polish official population figures 2006

Zatory
Pułtusk County